The diminutive woodrat (Nelsonia neotomodon) is a species of rodent in the family Cricetidae.
It is endemic to Mexico.

References

Musser, G. G. and M. D. Carleton. 2005. Superfamily Muroidea. pp. 894–1531 in Mammal Species of the World a Taxonomic and Geographic Reference. D. E. Wilson and D. M. Reeder eds. Johns Hopkins University Press, Baltimore.

Nelsonia (rodent)
Mammals described in 1897
Taxonomy articles created by Polbot
Taxa named by Clinton Hart Merriam